Johanna Matz (born 5 October 1932, in Vienna) is an Austrian film actress. She began as a dancer and later acted at the Burgtheater.

Selected filmography
  Maria Theresa (1951)
 Season in Salzburg (1952)
 The White Horse Inn (1952)
 The Sergeant's Daughter (1952)
  The Forester's Daughter (1952)
 Everything for Father (1953)
 Die Jungfrau auf dem Dach (1953), the German version of The Moon Is Blue (1953), which was filmed at the same time, on the same sets and days, filmed by the same director Otto Preminger, and in which she had a cameo
 Arlette Conquers Paris (1953)
 They Were So Young (1954)
 Ingrid - Die Geschichte eines Fotomodells (1955)
 The Life and Loves of Mozart (1955)
 The Congress Dances (1955)
 Regine (1956)
 And Lead Us Not Into Temptation (1957)
  (1958)
 Die unvollkommene Ehe (1959)
 Mrs. Warren's Profession (1960)
 The Happy Years of the Thorwalds (1962)
 Life Begins at Eight (1962)
 Call of the Forest (1965)
 The Captain (1971)
 When Mother Went on Strike (1974)

Decorations and awards
 1967: Appointed as chamber actress (Kammerschauspielerin)
 2002: Austrian Cross of Honour for Science and Art, 1st class

References

External links
 

1932 births
Austrian film actresses
Austrian television actresses
20th-century Austrian actresses
Actresses from Vienna
Living people
Recipients of the Austrian Cross of Honour for Science and Art, 1st class